Belén Martínez Sousa (born 24 November 1988) is a Spanish footballer who plays as a forward for Villarreal.

Club career
Martínez started her career at Llanos de Olivenza.

References

External links
Profile at La Liga

1988 births
Living people
Women's association football forwards
Spanish women's footballers
People from Olivenza
Sportspeople from the Province of Badajoz
Footballers from Extremadura
CD Badajoz Femenino players
Extremadura UD Femenino players
Santa Teresa CD players
Villarreal CF (women) players
Primera División (women) players
Segunda Federación (women) players